This is a list of films about the Czech resistance to Nazi occupation.

References

Czech resistance to Nazi occupation